The Deoha is a tributary of the Ramganga river. It rises in the Shivalik Hills and flows through the states of Uttarakhand and Uttar Pradesh.  It is known by the names of Nanda or Nandhaur in the Kumaon region of Uttarakhand. Upon its entry into the plains of Uttar Pradesh, the river gets the name of Deoha. Further downstream, it is also known as Garra. 

The holy sikh town of Nanakmatta is located on the banks of Deoha, and it is where the Nanak Sagar dam has been constructed on the river. Pilibhit, Bisalpur, Shahjahanpur and Sandi are other major cities located on its banks.

See Also 
 Nandhaur Wildlife Sanctuary

References 
 
 

Rivers of Uttar Pradesh
Rivers of Uttarakhand